Sun Zoom Spark was a mid-1990s British music magazine. It took its name from a track on Captain Beefheart's LP, Clear Spot and covered alternative rock and britpop music. Its editorial staff was based in Galashiels, Scotland.

History 

The magazine originally appeared as a fanzine in October 1992, sold by mail order.  Its unusually professional production made it an immediate success, and after four issues it began to be sold in record shops, at which point the issue numbers started again from 1. From issue 4 (July 1994) onwards, it became a full-colour national magazine sold in newsagents.

In October 1995, the magazine was radically reformatted as a fortnightly inkie under the title "The Trigger". It ran for only a handful of issues before closing down due to poor sales.

Format 

A large portion of each issue was given over to a regular section called "Spotlight Kid" which focused entirely on up-and-coming new acts. The magazine also contained several playful features distributed throughout the pages, such as the surreal cartoons "A Severed Head" (by Borin Van Loon) and "The Adventures Of Flagwoman", a parody of "Did You Know..." columns titled "It's Daft, Like... But It's True" and what the editors called "sparks", short mottos which appeared at the bottom of most pages (including the front cover). This latter feature was soon copied by the IPC Media publication Vox, leading to the tagline "...because Vox need the ideas" appearing on the cover of a later issue of Sun Zoom Spark. Another regular feature was "Ism-isms", a list of made-up buzzwords for various real or imagined cultural phenomena.

External links
Sun Zoom Spark mag 1 (jan 94) archive

Music magazines published in the United Kingdom
Defunct magazines published in the United Kingdom
Magazines established in 1992
Magazines disestablished in 1995
Biweekly magazines published in the United Kingdom